Décio Antonio Cabo Bianco (born 26 August 1944) is a Brazilian former footballer.

References

1944 births
Living people
Brazilian footballers
Association football forwards
Clube Atlético Juventus players
Pan American Games medalists in football
Pan American Games gold medalists for Brazil
Footballers at the 1963 Pan American Games
Medalists at the 1963 Pan American Games